Dolnji Križ is a small settlement in the Municipality of Žužemberk in southeastern Slovenia. The municipality is included in the Southeast Slovenia Statistical Region. The area is part of the traditional region of Lower Carniola.

References

External links
Dolnji Križ at Geopedia

Populated places in the Municipality of Žužemberk